Anna School District may refer to:
 Anna Community Consolidated School District 37 (Illinois)
 Anna Independent School District (Texas)